Sixteen teams participated in the 1986 ICC Trophy, the third edition of the tournament. No teams were making their debut, but two teams, Singapore and West Africa, did not return from the previous tournament in 1982. They were replaced by Argentina and Denmark, both of which had not appeared since the inaugural edition in 1979.

Argentina
Only players who appeared in at least one match at the tournament are listed. The leading run-scorer is marked with a dagger (†) and the leading wicket-taker with a double dagger (‡).

 Leo Alonso
 Douglas Annand
 Steve Bryans
 Derek Culley †
 Alexander Gooding ‡
 Robert Kirton
 Martin Martinez

 Alan Morris ‡
 Miguel Morris
 Brian Roberts
 Mark Roberts
 Luis Ross
 Peter Stocks
 Paul Taylor

Source: ESPNcricinfo

Bangladesh
Only players who appeared in at least one match at the tournament are listed. The leading run-scorer is marked with a dagger (†) and the leading wicket-taker with a double dagger (‡).

 Athar Ali Khan
 Atiq Khan
 Gazi Ashraf
 Gholam Nousher
 Golam Faruq
 Jahangir Shah‡
 Minhajul Abedin
 Nasir Ahmed

 Nehal Hasnain †
 Rafiqul Alam
 Raqibul Hasan
 Samiur Rahman
 Shaheedur Rahman
 Tanjeeb Ahsan
 Zahid Razzak

Source: ESPNcricinfo

Bermuda
Only players who appeared in at least one match at the tournament are listed. The leading run-scorer is marked with a dagger (†) and the leading wicket-taker with a double dagger (‡).

 Gary Brangman
 Terry Burgess
 Allan Douglas
 Pacer Edwards ‡
 Noel Gibbons
 Ricky Hill †
 Olin Jones
 Steven Lightbourne

 Andre Manders
 Arnold Manders
 Charlie Marshall
 Winston Reid
 Mark Trott
 John Tucker
 Clevie Wade

Source: ESPNcricinfo

Canada
Only players who appeared in at least one match at the tournament are listed. The leading run-scorer is marked with a dagger (†) and the leading wicket-taker with a double dagger (‡).

 Derek Abraham ‡
 Garvin Budhoo
 David Butcher
 John Corbin
 Ron Dipchand
 Derick Etwaroo
 Errol Jack
 Rohan Jayasekera

 Farooq Kirmani
 Clement Neblett
 Martin Prashad
 Paul Prashad †
 Roy Ramsammy
 Bhawan Singh
 Danny Singh
 Francis Waithe

Source: ESPNcricinfo

Denmark
Only players who appeared in at least one match at the tournament are listed. The leading run-scorer is marked with a dagger (†) and the leading wicket-taker with a double dagger (‡).

 Christian Ankersø
 Niels Bindslev
 Allan From-Hansen
 Thony Hadersland
 Søren Henriksen †
 Johnny Jensen
 Tim Jensen

 Søren Mikkelsen
 Jørgen Morild
 Ole Mortensen ‡
 Torben Nielsen
 Troel Nielsen
 Mogens Seider
 Steen Thomsen

Source: ESPNcricinfo

East Africa
Only players who appeared in at least one match at the tournament are listed. The leading run-scorer is marked with a dagger (†) and the leading wicket-taker with a double dagger (‡).

 Haroon Bags
 Balraj Bouri
 Pravin Desai
 David Galooba
 Alnasir Hasham
 Anil Kumar
 Sajaad Lakha ‡
 Hitash Patadia

 Dinesh Patel
 Farouk Patel
 Jayesh Patel
 Kirit Patel
 Gulam Shariff †
 James Shikuku
 Vali Tarmohamed
 Sam Walusimbi

Source: ESPNcricinfo

Fiji
Only players who appeared in at least one match at the tournament are listed. The leading run-scorer is marked with a dagger (†) and the leading wicket-taker with a double dagger (‡).

 Taione Batina
 Cecil Browne †
 Stephen Campbell
 Pensioni Gauna
 Roderick Jepsen
 S. Koto
 Joeli Mateyawa

 Jack McGoon
 Jone Seuvou
 Jone Sorovakatini
 Atunaisi Tawatatau ‡
 Eroni Vakausausa
 Inoke Veikauyaki
 Apenisa Waqaninamata ‡

Source: ESPNcricinfo

Gibraltar
Only players who appeared in at least one match at the tournament are listed. The leading run-scorer is marked with a dagger (†) and the leading wicket-taker with a double dagger (‡).

 Steve Boylan
 Bob Brooks
 Joe Buzaglo
 Richard Buzaglo
 Tim Buzaglo
 Gary De'Ath †
 Tito Gomez
 Salvador Perez
 Wilfred Perez

 Ian Prescott
 Alan Procter
 Jeffrey Rhodes
 Clive Robinson
 Christian Rocca
 Willie Scott
 Mike Smith
 Peter White ‡

Source: ESPNcricinfo

Hong Kong
Only players who appeared in at least one match at the tournament are listed. The leading run-scorer is marked with a dagger (†) and the leading wicket-taker with a double dagger (‡).

 Peter Anderson
 Ray Brewster
 Brian Catton
 Chris Collins
 Glyn Davies
 Bob Fotheringham ‡
 Rob Gill
 Bharat Gohel

 Des Greenwood
 Simon Myles †
 Nanda Perera
 Martin Sabine
 Neil Smith
 Nigel Stearns
 Yarman Vachha
 Mike Walsh

Source: ESPNcricinfo

Israel
Only players who appeared in at least one match at the tournament are listed. The leading run-scorer is marked with a dagger (†) and the leading wicket-taker with a double dagger (‡).

 Hillel Awasker ‡
 Benjamin David
 Noah Davidson
 Nissam Jhirad
 Michael Mohnblatt
 Zion Moshe
 Alan Moss
 David Moss †

 St. Eval Nemblette
 Stanley Perlman
 Shimshon Raj
 Nissam Reuben
 Reuben Reuben
 Joey Tal
 Valice Worrell

Source: ESPNcricinfo

Kenya
Only players who appeared in at least one match at the tournament are listed. The leading run-scorer is marked with a dagger (†) and the leading wicket-taker with a double dagger (‡).

 Avinash Chotai
 Tariq Iqbal
 Aasif Karim
 Daniel Macdonald
 Hitesh Mehta
 Alfred Njuguna
 Tito Odumbe

 Anil Patel
 Sailesh Radia
 Bharat Sawjani
 Zahoor Sheikh ‡
 Sudhir Solanki
 Tom Tikolo †
 Naguib Verjee

Source: ESPNcricinfo

Malaysia
Only players who appeared in at least one match at the tournament are listed. The leading run-scorer is marked with a dagger (†) and the leading wicket-taker with a double dagger (‡).

 Amarjit Singh Gill
 Asgari Stevens †
 Balakrishnan Nair
 Banerji Nair
 Desmon Patrik ‡
 Harris Abu Bakar
 Hatta Pattabongi

 K. Kamalanathan
 Lim Ju Jing
 Mohammad Saat Jalil
 Pasha Syafiq Ali
 Peter Budin
 V. Vijayalingham
 Yazid Imran

Source: ESPNcricinfo

Netherlands
Only players who appeared in at least one match at the tournament are listed. The leading run-scorer is marked with a dagger (†) and the leading wicket-taker with a double dagger (‡).

 Steve Atkinson †
 Paul-Jan Bakker
 Eric Dulfer
 Ronnie Elferink ‡
 Peter Entrop
 Rupert Gomes
 Roland Lefebvre

 Steven Lubbers
 Rene Schoonheim
 Mark van Heijningen
 Rob van Weelde
 Diederik Visée
 Huib Visée

Source: ESPNcricinfo

Papua New Guinea
Only players who appeared in at least one match at the tournament are listed. The leading run-scorer is marked with a dagger (†) and the leading wicket-taker with a double dagger (‡).

 Charles Amini
 Karo Ao
 Tau Ao
 Babani Harry †
 Raki Ila
 Renagi Ila
 Api Leka

 Daure Lohia
 William Maha
 Lagoa Manu
 Tuku Raka
 Gamu Ravu ‡
 Namba Tiana
 Taunao Vai

Source: ESPNcricinfo

United States
Only players who appeared in at least one match at the tournament are listed. The leading run-scorer is marked with a dagger (†) and the leading wicket-taker with a double dagger (‡).

 Hubert Blackman
 Yawar Faraz
 Teddy Foster
 Kishore Karecha
 Fazal Karim
 Neil Lashkari
 Kumar Lorick
 Jefferson Miller

 Tim Mills
 M. U. Prabhudas ‡
 Kamran Rasheed †
 Sew Shivnarine
 Sam Smith
 Victor Stoute
 Kennedy Venkersammy
 Jawaid Wajid

Source: ESPNcricinfo

Zimbabwe
Only players who appeared in at least one match at the tournament are listed. The leading run-scorer is marked with a dagger (†) and the leading wicket-taker with a double dagger (‡).

 Eddo Brandes
 Robin Brown
 Iain Butchart
 Christopher Cox
 David Houghton
 Malcolm Jarvis
 Grant Paterson †

 Andy Pycroft
 Peter Rawson ‡
 Colin Robertson
 Ali Shah
 John Traicos
 Gary Wallace
 Andy Waller

Source: ESPNcricinfo

Sources
 CricketArchive: Averages by teams, ICC Trophy 1986
 ESPNcricinfo: ICC Trophy, 1986 / Statistics

Cricket squads
ICC World Cup Qualifier